Johnson & Wales University (JWU) is a private university with its main campus in Providence, Rhode Island. Founded as a business school in 1914 by Gertrude I. Johnson and Mary T. Wales, JWU enrolled 7,357 students across its campuses in the fall of 2020. The university is accredited by the New England Commission of Higher Education.

History

1914–1947

Johnson & Wales Business School was founded in September 1914 in Providence, Rhode Island. Founders Gertrude I. Johnson and Mary T. Wales met as students at Pennsylvania State Normal School in Millersville, Pennsylvania. Years later, both were teaching at Bryant and Stratton business school in Providence (now Bryant University) when they decided to team up and open a business school. The school opened with one student and one typewriter on Hope Street in Providence. The school soon moved to a larger site on Olney Street, and later moved downtown to 36 Exchange Street to better serve returning soldiers after World War I. The curriculum in the early part of the 20th century included bookkeeping, typing, shorthand, English, and mathematics. The school admitted both men and women.

1947–1963

In June 1947, founders Johnson and Wales, facing old age and illness, sold Johnson & Wales Business School to partners (and Navy buddies) Edward Triangelo and Morris Gaebe. At this time the school had roughly 100 students.

Triangelo and Gaebe served as co-directors as the school grew rapidly. The school earned national accreditation in 1954. In 1960, Johnson & Wales was accredited as a junior college.

1963–present
The school became a registered nonprofit organization in 1963. Edward P. Triangolo served as the college's first president from 1963 to 1969.

During the 1960s and 1970s, as Providence hotels and department stores fled to the suburbs, Johnson and Wales took the opportunity to expand its downtown presence. The university purchased the former Crown Hotel in 1966, and both the former Dreyfus Hotel and the Gladdings Department Store building in 1975.

Morris Gaebe served as president from 1969 to 1989, and later chancellor. Gaebe introduced the hospitality program in 1972, despite skepticism from the college's board. Enrollment in the program grew from 141 students in 1973 to 3,000 in 1983. Eventually the school's culinary programs became widely renowned. The college officially became Johnson & Wales University in 1988, known informally as JWU.

By 2016, the university had 16,000 students and more than 2,400 employees across campuses in four cities. Degree programs were offered in business, culinary arts, arts and sciences, nutrition, education, hospitality, physician assistant studies, engineering, and design.

On June 25, 2020, the school announced it would shut down its Denver and North Miami campuses at the end of the 2020–21 school year.

Campuses 

Johnson & Wales University operates campuses in four locations:

 The founding Providence, Rhode Island campus housing JWU's business, hospitality, and technology programs (called Downcity and opened in 1914) with a subsidiary campus housing JWU's culinary and graduate programs (called Harborside and opened in 1985) in Cranston, Rhode Island
 North Miami, Florida (opened in 1992 – closed in 2021)
 Denver, Colorado (opened in 2000 – closed in 2021)
 Charlotte, North Carolina (opened in 2004)

Two previous campuses in Charleston, South Carolina (opened in 1984) and Norfolk, Virginia (opened in 1986), were gradually consolidated into the Charlotte campus, starting in September 2003 and ending in May 2006 with the closures of these campuses.

Facilities 

In addition to the on-campus academic buildings and dorms, the university also operates hotels used as practicum education facilities for the university's Hotel & Lodging Management, Food Service Management, and Culinary Arts degree programs. The university also owns the Doubletree Hotel Charlotte-Gateway Village at the Charlotte Campus.

The Wildcat Center is the athletic facility of Johnson & Wales University. Denver was the only campus to officially have that name, until the Providence campus renamed its gym as well (formerly the Harborside Recreation Center) and the construction of the Charlotte campus athletic facility. It is home to the athletic program of this branch of the university, and was home to the ABA's Colorado Storm in 2004. In Denver, Wildcat Center is located at the northwest part of the Johnson & Wales campus. The Wildcat Centers, fully renovated as of the summer of 2009, are NAIA and NCAA regulation size, and seat over 600. In Denver the fitness center has tripled in size, and the locker rooms have increased from two to four, to accommodate game day needs as well as general use. The Providence Wildcat Center is located on the Harborside Campus, and has many similar features. The fitness center is already large enough, at twice the size of the downtown center. The Charlotte Wildcat Center is located adjacent to the Cedar Hall South dorm building. The center covers 33,000 square feet and is the newest Wildcat Center to be built.

Providence now features the Scotts Miracle-Gro Athletic Complex, located on the Harborside campus, which hosts baseball, softball, soccer, lacrosse and field hockey.

Academics 

JWU currently has six academic units across each of its campuses:

 College of Business
 College of Culinary Arts
 College of Hospitality
 College of Health & Wellness
 College of Engineering & Design
 John Hazen White College of Arts & Sciences

The Providence campus is home to the College of Business, the Hospitality College, the College of Arts & Sciences, and the College of Engineering & Design. This campus is home to several additional academic units: the Alan Shawn Feinstein Graduate School and the College of Culinary Arts.  It also has the School of Education, which offers specialized master's and doctoral degree programs. Students just entering the field can earn a Master of Arts in Teaching (M.A.T. Program), and current teachers can earn a Master of Education degree (M.Ed.). For current teachers who want to advance their degree, there is a doctoral program where they can earn their Ed.D. Johnson & Wales University also offers 11 online bachelor's degrees and nine online master's degree programs.

Johnson & Wales University is well known for its culinary arts program, but was first founded as business and hospitality programs. The university is the largest food service educator in the world. JWU is one of the top three hospitality colleges, according to the 2010 rankings released by the American Universities Admissions Program, which ranks American universities according to their international reputation. JWU is home to the 39th largest college of business in the United States.

JWU's academic year was previously divided into three trimesters, each 11 weeks long, where the standard fall and spring semesters are replaced with fall, winter, and spring trimesters. Beginning in the 2020-2021 academic year, JWU began having two semesters, with a fall and spring semester respectively. With the start of the 2018–2019 academic year, JWU is offering all graduate degree programs, except for the master's-level education programs, on a semester calendar. The conversion to semesters will be completed in fall of 2020 for all undergraduate, continuing education and master's-level education programs offered at the university. Classes are also offered during the summer months, creating a fourth academic period. This results in an earlier spring break and a typical summer break from May to September. During fall, winter, and spring terms, students usually take three to four courses a term.  Students in the culinary program are enrolled in five nine-day lab sessions, which take place Monday through Thursday each week. Such courses are only available for full-time students.

Greek life

Providence campuses

The Providence Downcity and Harborside campuses currently offer membership in 15 fraternities and sororities as well as two social fellowships. These are organized within four groups who act as the governing bodies: the InterFraternity Council (IFC), the Panhellenic Council (PHC), the United Cultural Council (UCC), and the National Pan-Hellenic Council (NPHC). While all of these organizations are nationally or internationally affiliated, the university oversees the Greek community on campus. Not recognized by the university, the Providence campuses are also home to a number of "off-campus" fraternities. Deeply rooted in tradition, some of these organizations make up the origins of Greek life at the university and continue to exist and recruit new members without the sanction of the school.

Fraternities
 Tau Epsilon Phi
 Lambda Chi Alpha
 Phi Beta Sigma
 Theta Delta Chi
 Sigma Alpha Mu
 Alpha Phi Alpha

Sororities
 Alpha Sigma Tau
 Delta Phi Epsilon
 Sigma Delta Tau
 Sigma Gamma Rho
 Zeta Phi Beta
 Sigma Lambda Upsilon 
 Omega Phi Beta
 Delta Zeta

Social fellowships or other
 Groove Phi Groove Social Fellowship
 Swing Phi Swing Social Fellowship

North Miami campus

Fraternities
 Kappa Sigma
 Lambda Sigma Upsilon

Sororities
 Alpha Sigma Tau
 Zeta Phi Beta
 Mu Sigma Upsilon
 Chi Upsilon Sigma

Denver campus
 Alpha Sigma Tau

Charlotte campus

Fraternities
 Kappa Sigma
 Lambda Chi Alpha
 Alpha Phi Alpha
Kappa Alpha Psi

Sorority
 Delta Phi Epsilon
 Alpha Kappa Alpha
 Zeta Phi Beta

Athletics 
The teams of all campuses of Johnson & Wales University (active: Providence and Charlotte, and defunct: North Miami and Denver) are called the Wildcats.

Willie T. Wildcat (better known as Wildcat Willie) is the official costumed mascot. The suit was redesigned and revealed at the annual family weekend on October 16, 2013, as an early start to the school's centennial year (2014). Previously the costumes had been very different across the four campuses, but the new design replaced all former costumes. The new design came from Devon Tsinzo (Providence Class of 2015), who won the redesign contest. The new mascot was made by BAM! Mascots. Willie appears at home games, alumni events, and other special events. He is played by multiple students, meaning that JWU can accept requests for him to appear at many events. Although the various campuses compete either in the NAIA, USCAA, or NCAA Division III, Willie follows the rules of a Division I mascot, including never breaking character.

During the 1980s and 1990s the official mascot at the JWU Providence campus was Griff the Griffin, a creature with the head of an eagle, body of a lion and tail of a dragon.

Providence campuses 
The athletic teams of the Providence campuses (Downcity and Harborside) are members of the Division III level of the National Collegiate Athletic Association (NCAA), primarily competing in the Great Northeast Athletic Conference (GNAC) since the 1995–96 academic year; except the men's ice hockey team, which they compete as an associate member of the New England Hockey Conference (NEHC).

JWU–Providence competes in 15 intercollegiate varsity sports: Men's sports include baseball, basketball, ice hockey, lacrosse, soccer and wrestling; while women's sports include basketball, field hockey, ice hockey, lacrosse, rowing, soccer, softball and volleyball; and co-ed sports include equestrian.

North Miami campus 
The athletic teams of the North Miami campus were members of the National Association of Intercollegiate Athletics (NAIA), primarily competing in the Sun Conference from 2009–10 to 2019–20. The Wildcats previously competed as an NAIA Independent within the Association of Independent Institutions (AII) from about 2005–06 to 2008–09.

JWU–North Miami competed in 11 intercollegiate varsity sports: Men's sports included basketball, cross country, golf, soccer and track & field, while women's sports included basketball, cross country, golf, soccer, track & field and volleyball.

As part of the North Miami campus's closure in 2021, on July 28, 2020, JWU published a memorandum that detailed the discontinuation of all sports seasons and competitions there.

Charlotte campus 
The athletic teams of the Charlotte campus are members of the United States Collegiate Athletic Association (USCAA), primarily competing in the Eastern Metro Athletic Conference (EMAC) since the 2018–19 academic year.

JWU–Charlotte competes in 12 intercollegiate varsity sports: Men's sports include basketball, cross country, golf, soccer and volleyball; while women's sports include basketball, cross country, golf, soccer, tennis, track & field and volleyball.

The JWU Charlotte Lady Wildcats basketball team won the 2018 USCAA Division II National Championship.

Denver campus 
The athletic teams of the Denver campus were members of the Division III level of the National Collegiate Athletic Association (NCAA), primarily competing in the Southern Collegiate Athletic Conference (SCAC) from 2018–19 to 2019–20. The Wildcats previously competed as an NAIA Independent within the Association of Independent Institutions (AII) of the National Association of Intercollegiate Athletics (NAIA) from about 2005–06 to 2017–18; while its women's lacrosse team competed as an affiliate member of the Kansas Collegiate Athletic Conference (KCAC).

JWU–Denver competed in 15 intercollegiate varsity sports: Men's sports included basketball, cross country, soccer and track & field (indoor and outdoor); while women's sports included basketball, cross country, lacrosse, soccer, track & field (indoor and outdoor) and volleyball.

Move to NCAA Division III 
JWU Denver announced on February 21, 2017, that it would transition from the NAIA to NCAA Division III, a multi-year journey commencing with an "exploratory year" in fall 2017. The school plans to compete as a member of the SCAC, beginning with the 2018–19 season, where it was paired up as a travel partner with the SCAC's Colorado College.

As part of the Denver campus's closure at the end of the 2020–21 school year, JWU announced on June 26, 2020, that all athletic programs there were terminated and that student-athletes were granted releases to talk with other schools.

Charleston campus 
The athletic teams of the Charleston campus were members of the National Association of Intercollegiate Athletics (NAIA), primarily competing as an NAIA Independent from about 1984–85 to 2002–03.

Norfolk campus 
The athletic teams of the Norfolk campus were members of the National Association of Intercollegiate Athletics (NAIA), primarily competing as an NAIA Independent from about 1986–87 to 2005–06.

Awards
 Culinary Hall of Fame induction

Notable alumni 
 Michelle Bernstein (1994), chef and restaurateur
 Andrew Gruel, celebrity chef, restaurateur, and television personality 
Jeanine Calkin, member of the Rhode Island Senate 
 Stephanie Cmar (2007), chef and Top Chef contestant
 Graham Elliot Bowles (2007), celebrity chef
 Tyler Florence (1994)
Rahman "Rock" Harper (1996), Hell's Kitchen season 3 winner
 Chris Hastings (1984), chef and restaurateur 
 Andy Husbands (1992), chef, restaurateur, author and television personality
 Maria Kanellis (2017), pro wrestler and valet
 Emeril Lagasse (1978), celebrity chef and television personality
 Scott Leibfried (1993), chef and culinary consultant, Hell's Kitchen sous chef, blue team (seasons 1–10)
 Thomas Michael McGovern (2001, Ed.D.), college president
 J. A. Moore, member of the South Carolina House of Representatives
 Anna Olson (1995), celebrity chef and television personality, Food Network Canada
 Jim Renner (2007), pro golfer
 Charles Rosa (2008), professional Mixed Martial Artist
Aaron Sanchez, celebrity chef
 Chris Santos (1993), celebrity chef and television personality
 Ben Silverman, professional golfer
 Adrianne Calvo (2004), chef and television personality
 Chris Cosentino (1994), chef and television personality
 David Kinch (1981), American chef and restauranteur
 Beau MacMillan (1991), American chef and television personality
 Charlie Ayers (1990), American chef, cookbook author, and restaurateur
 Blac Chyna (dropped out in 1998), model and socialite

References

External links

 
 Johnson & Wales–Providence athletics website
 Johnson & Wales–Charlotte athletics website

 
Cooking schools in the United States
Hospitality schools in the United States
Universities and colleges in Providence, Rhode Island
Universities and colleges in Charlotte, North Carolina
Universities and colleges in Denver
Universities and colleges in Miami-Dade County, Florida
North Miami, Florida
Defunct universities and colleges in Colorado
Defunct universities and colleges in Florida
Educational institutions established in 1914
1914 establishments in Rhode Island
USCAA member institutions
New England Hockey Conference teams
Private universities and colleges in North Carolina
Private universities and colleges in Rhode Island